William Mather Lewis (March 24, 1878 – November 11, 1945) was an American teacher, university president, local politician, and a state and national government official. He was mayor of Lake Forest, Illinois from 1915 to 1917, President of George Washington University from 1923 to 1927 and the President of Lafayette College from 1927 to 1945.

Early life
Lewis was born in Howell, Michigan on March 24, 1878. His father was Rev. James Lewis, minister of the Howell church from 1875 to 1882, and his mother was Mary Farrand.

Education
Lewis attended Knox College. Lewis received an A.B. from Lake Forest College in 1900, and an A.M. from Illinois College in 1902. Later, he would receive his Ph.D. from the University of Berlin. He was a member of Phi Delta Theta.

Career

Lake Forest
Lewis was briefly principal of Whipple Academy, Jacksonville (a preparatory school of Illinois College), before returning to Lake Forest to be head of the department of oratory and debate at Lake Forest Academy for three years. In 1905 he became headmaster at the academy, resigning in 1913 to travel and study in Europe. He was mayor of Lake Forest, Illinois from 1915–17.

State and national roles
Lewis was field secretary of the Navy League of the United States in the Midwest in 1915.

During World War I, he was executive secretary of the National Committee of Patriotic Societies. Lewis was director of the savings division of the United States Treasury Department and chief of educational service for the U.S. Chamber of Commerce from 1921 to 1923.

Because of his earlier work during World War I, Lewis was appointed by Governor Arthur James as the director of the Pennsylvania Selective Service System (organising "the draft"), which he did without pay from September 1940 until he stepped down in November 1941 since it detracted from his duties as president of Lafayette College.

University career
Lewis was President of George Washington University from June 1923 to 1927, and President of Lafayette College from March 1927 until retiring in July 1945, shortly before his death. He was succeeded by Ralph Cooper Hutchison.

Other
Lewis was a contributor to the Encyclopædia Britannica. He was awarded a patent for a milk bottle holder in 1918.

Personal life
He married Ruth Durand in Lake Forest on December 20, 1906 and they had a daughter, Sarah Durand Lewis Betts Hale (1907–2006). They had a summer home in Colebrook, Connecticut, where they later lived.

They spent more than a year travelling and studying in Europe, including England and Berlin, from June 1913 to October 1914. This enabled Lewis to obtain a Ph.D. from the University of Berlin.

Death
Lewis died from a heart attack while driving near his home on November 11, 1945. His widow Ruth died in 1953.

Books
 Lewis, William Mather. Selected Readings from the Most Popular Novels. Hinds and Noble, 1903.
 Lewis, William Mather. The Voices of Our Leaders. Hinds, Hayden & Elderedge, Inc., 1917
 Lewis, William Mather. From a College Platform: Addresses. Dial Press, Inc., 1932.

See also
List of Lafayette College people
List of George Washington University people
List of people from Lake Forest, Illinois

References

External links

 Lewis, William Mather, The George Washington University and Foggy Bottom Historical Encyclopedia
 1920s flyer advertising a talk by Lewis at the Lyceum, University of Iowa library
 Biography of Lewis by Editors National Press Syndicate, University of Iowa library
Images of Lewis from Lafayette College

Presidents of George Washington University
Presidents of Lafayette College
Lafayette College trustees
1878 births
1945 deaths
People from Lake Forest, Illinois
Lake Forest College alumni
Lake Forest Academy alumni
People from Howell, Michigan
Illinois College alumni
Mayors of places in Illinois
People from Colebrook, Connecticut
George Washington University faculty
United States Department of the Treasury officials
United States Chamber of Commerce people